Peter Bäni (born 7 February 1945) is a Swiss retired slalom canoeist who competed from the late 1960s to the early 1970s. He finished 27th in the K-1 event at the 1972 Summer Olympics in Munich.

References
Sports-reference.com profile

1945 births
Canoeists at the 1972 Summer Olympics
Living people
Olympic canoeists of Switzerland
Swiss male canoeists
20th-century Swiss people
Place of birth missing (living people)